Margaret Lockwood (28 March 1911 – 14 January 1999) was an English cricketer who played primarily as a wicket-keeper. She appeared in two Test matches for England in 1951, both against Australia. She played domestic cricket for Yorkshire.

References

External links
 
 

1911 births
1999 deaths
Cricketers from Huddersfield
England women Test cricketers
Yorkshire women cricketers